The ICCF Bulgaria belongs to the ICCF national member federations.

Achievements
The Bulgarian correspondence chess players had their biggest achievements at the Final of the VII Correspondence Chess Olympiad where the Bulgarian team (G. Popov, D. Andreev, A. Kiprov, G. Sapundjev, D. Karapchanski, and P. Angelov) took 2nd place and won silver.

Grandmaster

Mladen Gudyev
Valentin Dimitrov Iotov
Nikolai Ninov
Dr. Georgi Alexandrov Popov

Senior International Master
Krasimir Bochev
Iskren Dimov
Aleksandr Gavazov
Illa Hristov
Borislav Kalchev
Joncho Kalchev
Karapchanski Dimitar
Sapundjiev Georgi
Sitoyanov Zlatin
Vasilev Vasil
Vinchev Simeon

International Master
Dobrotich Andrejev  
Dimitar Krastanov
Ivan Minkov 
Slavei Mladenov  
Valentin Petrov
Ivan Popov 
Ing. Lyulin Radulov
Stefan Sergiev 
Petko Slavchev
Spas Spasov
Tenio Tenev

References

External links
  ICCF Bulgaria
  History SKSB

Further reading
 ICCF Gold 50th Jubilee Celebration (2002), P.Hegoburu, I.Bottlik, 

Bulgaria
Chess in Bulgaria
Correspondence chess
Correspondence chess organizations